Ilya Yefimovich Repin (– 29 September 1930) was a Russian painter. He became one of the most renowned artists in Russia in the 19th century. His major works include Barge Haulers on the Volga (1873), Religious Procession in Kursk Province (1880–1883), Ivan the Terrible and His Son Ivan (1885); and Reply of the Zaporozhian Cossacks (1880–1891). He is also known for the revealing portraits he made of the leading literary and artistic figures of his time, including Mikhail Glinka, Modest Mussorgsky, Pavel Tretyakov and especially Leo Tolstoy, with whom he had a long friendship.

Repin was born in Chuguev, in Kharkov Governorate of the Russian Empire. His father had served in an  Uhlan Regiment in the Russian army, and then sold horses. Repin began painting icons at age sixteen. He failed at his first effort to enter the Imperial Academy of Fine Arts in Saint Petersburg, but went to the city anyway in 1863, audited courses, and won his first prizes in 1869 and 1871. In 1872, after a tour along the Volga River, he presented his drawings at the Academy of Art in St. Petersburg. The Grand Duke Alexander Alexandrovich awarded him a commission for a large scale painting, The Barge Haulers of the Volga, which launched his career. He spent two years in Paris and Normandy, seeing the first Impressionist expositions and learning the techniques of painting in the open air.

He suffered one setback in 1885 when his history portrait of Ivan the Terrible killing his own son in a rage caused a scandal, resulting in the painting being removed from exhibition. But this was followed by a series of major successes and new commissions. In 1898, with his second wife, he purchased a country house, The Penates, in Kuokkala, Finland (now Repino, Saint Petersburg), close to St. Petersburg, where they entertained Russian society.

In 1905, following the repression of street demonstrations by the Imperial government, he quit his teaching position at the Academy of Fine Arts. He welcomed the February Revolution in 1917, but was appalled by the violence and terror unleashed by the Bolsheviks following the October Revolution. Finland broke away from Russia in 1917, and Repin was unable to travel to St. Petersburg (renamed Leningrad), even for an exhibition of his own works in 1925. Repin died on 29 September 1930, at the age of 86, and was buried at the Penates. His home is now a museum and a UNESCO World Heritage Site.

Biography

Early life and work

Repin was born on 24 July 1844 in the town of Chuguev, in the Kharkov Governorate of the Russian Empire, in the heart of the historical region of Sloboda Ukraine. His father, Yefim Vasilyevich Repin (1804—1894) served in an  Uhlan Regiment of the Imperial Russian Army. He fought in the Russo-Persian War (1826–1828), the Russo-Turkish War (1828–29) and the Hungarian campaign (1849). When his father retired from the army, after twenty-seven years of service, he became an itinerant merchant selling horses.

Repin's mother, Tatiana Stepanovna Repina (née Bocharova) (1811—1880), was also the daughter of a soldier. She had family ties to noblemen and officers; the Repins had six children and were moderately well-off. In 1855, at the age of eleven, he was enrolled at the local school where his mother taught. He showed  a talent for drawing and painting, and when he was thirteen, his father enrolled him in the workshop of Ivan Bunakov, an icon painter. He restored old icons and painted portraits of local notables. At the age of sixteen, his skill was recognized, and he became a member of an artel, or cooperative of artists, the Society for the Encouragement of Artists, which traveled around Voronezh province to paint icons and wall paintings.

Repin had much higher ambitions. In October 1863 he competed for admission to the Imperial Academy of Arts in the capital, Saint Petersburg. He failed in his first attempt, but persevered, rented a small room in the city, and took courses in academic drawing. In January 1864 he succeeded and was allowed, without fee, to attend classes.

At the academy he met the painter Ivan Kramskoi, who became his professor and mentor. When Kramskoi founded the first independent union of Russian artists, Repin became a member. In 1869 he was awarded a gold medal second-class for his painting Job and His Brothers. He met the influential critic Vladimir Stasov and painted a portrait of Vera Shevtsova, his own future wife.

First success 

In 1870, with two other artists, Repin traveled to the Volga River to sketch landscapes and studies of barge haulers (The Repin House in Tolyatti and the Repin Museum on the Volga commemorate this visit). When he returned to Saint Petersburg, the quality of his Volga boatmen drawings won him a commission from Grand Duke Vladimir Alexandrovich for a large scale painting on the subject. The painting, Barge Haulers on the Volga was completed in 1873. The following year he was awarded a gold medal first-class for his painting The Resurrection of the Daughter of Jairus

In May 1872 he married Vera Alexeievna Shevtsova. (1855-1917). She joined him on his travels, including a trip to Samara, where their first child, Vera, was born. They had three other children; Nadia, Yuri, and Tatyana. The marriage was difficult, as Repin had numerous affairs, while Vera cared for the children. They were married for fifteen years.

In an 1872 letter to Stasov, Repin wrote: "Now it is the peasant who is the judge and so it is necessary to represent his interests. (That is just the thing for me, since I am myself, as you know, a peasant, the son of a retired soldier who served twenty-seven hard years in Nicholas I's army.)" In 1873 Repin traveled to Italy and France with his family. His second daughter, Nadezhda, was born in 1874.

Paris and Normandy 

Repin's painting Barge Haulers of the Volga, shown at the Vienna International Exposition, brought him his first International attention. It also earned him a grant from the Academy of Fine Arts which allowed him to make an extended tour of several months to Austria, then Italy, and finally in 1873, to Paris. He rented an apartment in Montmartre at 13 rue Veron, and a small attic studio under a mansard roof at number 31 on the same street.

He remained in Paris for two years. He described his subjects as "the principal types of Parisians, in the most typical settings." He painted the street markets and boulevards of Paris, and especially the varied faces and costumes of the Parisians of every class. His major Russian work created in Paris was Sadko (1876), a mystical allegory of an undersea kingdom, which included elements of Art Nouveau. He gave the young heroine a Russian face, surrounded by a strange and exotic setting. He wrote to his friend the civic Stasov: "This idea describes my present situation, and perhaps, the situation of all of our Russian art". In 1876, His Sadko painting won him a place in the Russian Academy of Fine Arts.

He was in Paris in April 1874, when the first Impressionist exhibition was held. In 1875, he wrote to Stasov about "The liberty of the "impressionalists", Manet, Monet et the others, and their infantile truthfulness." In 1876 He painted a portrait of his wife Vera in the exact style of Berthe Morisot's portrait by Édouard Manet. as a tribute to Manet and Morisot. Though he admired some impressionist techniques, especially their depictions of light and color, he felt their work lacked moral or social purpose, key factors in his own art.

Following the ideas of the Impressionists, he spent two months at Veules-les-Roses in Normandy, painting landscapes in the open air. In 1874–1876 he contributed to the Salon in Paris. In 1876 he wrote to the secretary of the Russian academy of arts: "You told me not to become "Francified." What are you saying? I dream only of returning to Russia and working seriously. But Paris was of great utility to me, it can't be denied."

Moscow and "The Wanderers" (1876–1885) 

Repin returned to Russia in 1876. His son Yury was born the following year. He moved to Moscow that year, and produced a wide variety of works including portraits of the painters Arkhip Kuindzhi and Ivan Shishkin. He became involved with the "Wanderers", an artistic movement founded in St. Petersburg in 1863. The style of the Wanderers was resolutely realistic, patriotic, and politically engaged, determined to break with classical models and to create a specifically Russian art. It involved not only painters, but sculptors, writers and composers.

Repin created a series of major historical works, including the Religious Procession in Kursk Governorate (1883), which was presented at the 12th annual exposition of the Wanderers. It was notable both for its extraordinary crowd of realistic figures, including surly policemen, weary monks, children and beggars, each expressing a vivid personality. He also experimented with outdoor sunlight effects, apparently influenced by the impressionists and his outdoor studies in France. His next major work of this period was Ivan the Terrible and His Son Ivan. This painting, depicting the tsar, his face full of horror, just after he has killed his son with his sceptre in a demented rage. It caused a scandal. Some critics saw it as a veiled criticism of Tsar Alexander III, who had brutally suppressed the opposition after a failed assassination attempt. It was also attacked by the more aesthetic faction of the Wanderers, who considered it overly sensationalist. It was vandalised twice and was finally, at the tsar's request, removed from view. The tsar reconsidered his decision, and the painting was finally put back on view.

The portrait of the Tsarevna Sophia Alekseyevna is one of his most tragic historical works. It depicts The daughter of Tsar Alexis who became regent of Russia after the death of her father, but then was deposed from power in 1689 and locked away in a convent by her half-brother, Peter the Great. The painting captures her fury as she realises her future life.

"They Did Not Expect Him". (1884-1888),(Tretyakov Gallery) is a notable and subtle historical work of the period, depicting a young man, a former "narodniki" or revolutionary, emaciated and frail from prison and exile, returning unexpectedly to his family. The story is told by the different expressions on the faces of his family and small details, such as the portraits of Tsar Alexander III and of favourite Russian poets on the wall.

Repin and Tolstoy 

In 1880 Lev Tolstoy came to Repin's small studio on Bolshoi Trubny street in Moscow to introduce himself. This developed into a friendship between the 36-year-old painter and the 52-year-old writer that lasted thirty years until Tolstoy's death in 1910. Repin regularly visited Tolstoy at his Moscow residence, and his country estate at Yasnaya Polyana. He painted a series of portraits of Tolstoy in peasant dress, working and reading under a tree at Yasnaya Polyana Tolstoy wrote of an 1887 visit by Repin: "Repin came to see me and painted a fine portrait. I appreciate him more and more; he is lively person, approaching the light to which all of us aspire, including us poor sinners." His last trip to see Tolstoy at Yasnaya Polyana was in 1907, when Tolstoy was 79. Despite his age, Tolstoy went horseback riding with Repin, ploughed fields, cleared paths of brush hiked through the countryside for nine hours all the while discussing philosophy and morals. Repin's portraits of Tolstoy in country dress were widely exhibited, and helped build Tolstoy's legendary image.

Repin and Russian composers 

In addition to his portraits of Tolstoy and Russian writers, Repin painted portraits of the major Russian composers of his time, His images, like his paintings of Tolstoy and other writers, became an integral part of the image of these composers. His portrait of Modest Moussorgsky was particularly famous. The composer suffered from alcoholism and depression. Repin painted him in four sittings, beginning four days before his death. When Moussorgsky died, Repin used the proceeds of the sale of the painting to erect a monument to the composer.

His portrait of Mikhail Glinka, composer of the opera "Ruslan and Ludmilla" (1887) was an unusual work for Repin. it was painted after Glinka's death; Repin never met him, and based on drawings and recollections of others. Other composers painted by Repin included Alexander Glazunov who had just completed Borodin's opera "Prince Igor", and Anton Rubinstein the founder of the Saint Petersburg Conservatory of Music.

His third daughter, Tatyana, was born in 1880. He frequented the art circle of Savva Mamontov, which gathered at Abramtsevo, his estate near Moscow. Here Repin met many of the leading painters of the day, including Vasily Polenov, Valentin Serov, and Mikhail Vrubel. In 1882 he and Vera divorced; they maintained a friendly relationship afterwards.

Repin's contemporaries often commented on his special ability of capturing peasant life in his works. In an 1876 letter to Stasov, Kramskoi wrote: "Repin is capable of depicting the Russian peasant exactly as he is. I know many artists who have painted peasants, some of them very well, but none of them ever came close to what Repin does." Leo Tolstoy later stated that Repin "depicts the life of the people much better than any other Russian artist." He was praised for his ability to reproduce human life with powerful and vivid force.

Reply of the Zaporozhian Cossacks

In 1883 he traveled around Western Europe with Vladimir Stasov. Repin's painting Religious Procession in Kursk Province was shown at the eleventh Itinerants' Society Exhibition. In that year he painted "The wall of Pere Lachaise Cemetery commemorating the Paris Commune". In 1886, he traveled to the Crimea with Arkhip Kuinji, and produced drawings and sketches on Biblical subjects.

In 1887 he visited Austria, Italy, and Germany, and retired from the board of the Wanderers, painted two portraits of Leo Tolstoy at Yasnaya Polyana and painted Alexander Pushkin on the Shore of the Black Sea (in collaboration with Ivan Aivazovsky). In 1888 he traveled to Southern Russia and the Caucasus, where he did sketches and studies of descendants of the Zaporozhian Cossacks.

Many of Repin's finest portraits were produced in the 1880s. Through the presentation of real faces, these portraits express the rich, tragical, and hopeful spirit of the period. His portraits of Aleksey Pisemsky (1880), Modest Mussorgsky (1881), and others created throughout the decade have become familiar to whole generations of Russians. Each is completely lifelike, conveying the transient, changeable nature of the sitter's state of mind. They give an intense embodiment of both the physical and spiritual life of the people who sat for him.

In 1887 he was separated from his wife Vera. He visited Tolstoy at Yasnaya Polyana, and painted his portrait, and then took a long trip along the Volga and the Don, to the Cossack regions. This trip gave him material for his most famous historical work, Reply of the Zaporozhian Cossacks. The painting depicts an apocryphal event in 1678, when a group of cossacks supposedly amused themselves by drafting a highly insulting letter to the Turkish sultan, addressing him as "The Grand Imbecile." Repin worked on this painting periodically between 1880 and 1891, creating an extraordinary ensemble of expressive faces. Most of the models were faculty members from the Academy of Arts, and had a variety of nationalities, including Russians, Ukrainians, a Cossack student, Greeks, and Poles. The cossack in a blue hat in the center is Mikhail Dragomirov, a General in the Russian army. The Cossack with a yellow hat, at the top right and almost hidden by Taras Bulba, is Fyodor Stravinsky, an opera singer with the Mariinsky Theatre, of Polish descent, and the father of the composer Igor Stravinsky. The finished work was so popular that he painted a second version.

In 1894 he became the head of the painting workshop at the Academy of Fine Arts in Saint Petersburg. He remained in this position until 1905, when he resigned in protest against the firing by government soldiers into a crowd of demonstrators outside the Winter Palace in Saint Petersburg. Repin describes 1905 as "a year of disaster and shame".

In 1890 he was given a government commission to work on the creation of a new statute for the Academy of Arts. In 1891 he resigned from the Wanderers in protest against a new statute that restricted the rights of young artists. An exhibition of works by Repin and Shishkin was held in the Academy of Arts, including Reply of the Zaporozhian Cossacks. In 1892 he held a one-man exhibition at the History Museum in Moscow. In 1893 he visited academic art schools in Warsaw, Kraków, Munich, Vienna, and Paris to observe and study teaching methods. He spent the winter in Italy and published his essays Letters on Art.

In 1894 he began teaching a class at the Higher Art School attached to the Academy of Arts, a position he held, off and on, until 1907. In 1895 he painted portraits of Emperor Nicholas II, and Princess Maria Tenisheva. In 1896 he attended the All-Russian Exhibition in Nizhni Novgorod. His paintings were exhibited in Saint Petersburg, at the Exhibition of Works of Creative Art. His paintings from this year included The Duel and Don Juan and Dona Anna. In 1897 he rejoined the Wanderers, and was appointed rector of the Higher Artistic School for a year. In 1898 he traveled to the Holy Land, and painted the icon Carrying the Cross for the Russian Orthodox Alexander Nevsky Cathedral in Jerusalem. After returning to Russia, he attended Pavel Tretyakov's funeral. In 1899 he joined the editorial board of the magazine World of Art, but soon quit.

Move to Finland (1890) 

In 1890 Repin met Natalia Nordman (1863-1914), who became his common-law wife. She was the daughter of an admiral, a writer and feminist, an activist for the improvement of working conditions. She advocated a simple life close to nature. In 1899 he acquired land near a village of Kuokkala, about forty kilometres north of St. Petersburg, and they built a country house, called the Penates, which became his home for the next thirty years. It was located in the Grand Duchy of Finland, then part of the Russian Empire. about an hour by train from St. Petersburg. At first he used it only as a summer house, but after he resigned from the St. Petersburg Academy of Fine Arts in 1907, it became his full-time home and studio. 
It was a rather eccentric estate, including a studio covered with a pyramidal lantern roof, a landscape garden with a "Pushkin alley" of trees, a multicoloured music kiosk in the Egyptian style, and a telescope overlooking the Gulf of Finland. He hosted vegetarian breakfasts for his guests (a practice he adapted from Tolstoy), and very elaborate receptions on Wednesdays. His Wednesday guests included the opera singer Chaliapin, the writer Maxim Gorky, the composer Alexander Glazunov the writer Aleksandr Kuprin; artists Vasily Polenov, Isaak Brodsky and Nicolai Fechin as well as poet Vladimir Mayakovsky, philosopher Vasily Rozanov and scientist Vladimir Bekhterev.

In 1900 he took Nordman to the World Exhibition in Paris, where he served as a painting judge. They visited Munich, the Tyrol, and Prague, His painting Get Thee Behind Me, Satan! was shown at the 29th Exhibition of the Wanderers. In 1901 he received from the Tsar one of his largest commissions, for sixty portraits of the members of State Council. He proceeded with the help of photographs and the aid of two of his students. One of the subjects in the series was Alexander Kerensky, the Russian president before the Bolshevik seizure of power. In addition to his government commissions, he found time for a light work on an entirely different theme; a painting in 1902–1903 called "What Freedom!" depicting two students dancing in the waves at the beach after completing their examinations.

1900-1905 - Revolution and Disillusion 

The repression of popular demonstrations in front of the Winter Palace in St. Petersburg in 1905 disillusioned Repin. He called 1905 "the year of disaster and shame". He resigned from his teaching post at the Academy of Fine Arts, and concentrated on painting. The movements toward democracy in the early 20th century inspired Repin, he joined the Constitutional Democratic Party, was offered the rank of Councillor of State, and was invited to take a seat in the Duma, the national assembly. He made a colourful painting of the celebration of the new Russian Constitution of 1905. Later, he painted the portrait of the newly-elected Russian President, Alexander Kerensky.

Repin concentrated on writing his memoirs, which he finished in 1915. He visited St. Peterburg to see expositions, including a 1909 show of works by the modernist Kandinsky. Repin was not impressed; he described it as "the swamps of artistic corruption."

In 1900 he took his common-law wife Natalia Nordman to the World Exhibition in Paris, where he served as a painting judge. He visited Munich, the Tyrol, and Prague, and painted Natalia Nordman in a Tyrolese Hat and In the Sunlight: Portrait of Nadezhda Repina. In 1901 he was awarded the Legion of Honor. His painting Get Thee Behind Me, Satan! was shown at the 29th Itinerants' Society Exhibition. In 1902–1903 his works included the paintings Ceremonial Meeting of the State Council and What a Freedom!, over forty portrait studies, and portraits of Sergei Witte and Vyacheslav von Plehve. Ceremonial Meeting of the State Council was the most demanding work commissioned by Repin, requiring numerous studies of the 100 councilors depicted, and the help of two of Repin's pupils.

In 1904 he gave a speech at a memorial gathering for the artist Vasily Vereshchagin. He painted a portrait of the writer Leonid Andreyev and his work The Death of the Cossack Squadron Commander Zinovyev. He made sketches depicting government troops opening fire on a peaceful demonstration on 9 December 1905. During 1905 Repin participated in many protests
against bloodshed and Tsarist repressions, and tried to convey his impressions of these emotionally and politically charged events in his paintings.

He also did sketches for portraits of Maxim Gorky and Vladimir Stasov and two portraits of Natalia Nordman. In 1907 he resigned from the Academy of Arts, visited Chuguyev and the Crimea, and wrote reminiscences of Vladimir Stasov. In 1908 he publicly denounced capital punishment in Russia. He illustrated Leonid Andreyev's story The Seven Who Were Hanged, and his painting The Cossacks from the Black Sea Coast was exhibited at the Itinerants' Society Exhibition. In 1909 he painted Gogol Burning the Manuscript of the Second Part of Dead Souls, and in 1910, portraits of Pyotr Stolypin, and the children's writer and poet Korney Chukovsky.

War, the Bolshevik Revolution and later years (1917-1930) 

The outbreak of the First World War in 1914 brought a series of setbacks and tragedies to Repin. His wife became ill with tuberculosis, and departed for treatment in Locarno, Switzerland. She refused assistance from her family and died in Switzerland in 1914. Then, following the October 1917 Bolshevik Revolution, Finland, including the Penates, declared its independence from Russia. The border was closed, and Repin refused to return to Russia. He turned to Finland for new clients, painting a large group portrait of notable Finnish leaders and artists, including the architect Eliel Saarinen, the composer Jean Sibelius, and the future Finnish President Carl Gustav Mannerheim. Repin included the back of his own head in the painting.

In 1916, Repin worked on his book of reminiscences, Far and Near, with the assistance of Korney Chukovsky. He welcomed the early phases of the Russian Revolution, namely the February Revolution of February 1917. However, he was hostile to the Bolsheviks and was appalled by their rise to power in the October Revolution and the violence and terror they unleashed thereafter. In 1919. he donated his collection of works by Russian artists and his own works to the Finnish National Gallery in Helsinki, and in 1920 honorary celebrations of Repin were held by artistic circles in Finland. In 1921–1922 he painted The Ascent of Elijah the Prophet and Christ and Mary Magdalene (The Morning of the Resurrection).

Repin was so hostile to the new Soviet regime, that he even lashed out at their spelling "reform". Specifically, he objected to writing his last name Рѣпинъ (Riepin) under the new rules, which made it Репин, as the elimination of ѣ led many people to incorrectly spell his name as Ryopin.

After end of the war in 1918, Repin could travel again. In 1923, Repin held a one-man exhibition in Prague. Celebrations were given in 1924 in Kuokkala to mark Repin's 80th birthday, and an exhibition of his works was held in Moscow. In 1925, a jubilee exhibition of his works was held in the Russian Museum in Leningrad (renamed St Petersburg-Petrograd). The rising Soviet dictator, Joseph Stalin, sent a delegation of Soviet artists, including a former student of Repin, Isaak Brodsky, to persuade Repin to return to St. Petersburg, and to give up his residence in Finland. But Repin did not want to be under the thumb of Stalin, and refused, though he donated three sketches devoted to the Revolution of 1905 and the portrait of Alexander Kerensky to the Museum of the Revolution of 1905. In 1928–29, still in Finland, he continued working on the painting The Hopak Dance (The Zaporozhye Cossacks Dancing), begun in 1926, which was his final work. It portrays Repin's admiration of Ukraine and its culture. Repin painted it with oil on linoleum, because he could not get a canvas large enough.

Repin died in 1930, and was buried at the Penates. After the Soviet invasion of Finland in 1939, the territory of Kuokkala was annexed by the USSR. In 1948, despite Repin's hostility towards Bolshevism, it was renamed Repino in his honor. The Penates became a museum in 1940, and is now a UNESCO World Heritage Site.

Portraits 

Repin particularly excelled at portrait painting. He produced more than three hundred portraits in his career. He painted most of the notable political figures, writers and composers of his time. One exception was Dostoevsky, whose mysticism Repin did not appreciate at all. He preceded each portrait with six or seven sketches. He had to persuade a reluctant Tolstoy to be portrayed working in a field with bare feet, as he usually did.

Repin persistently searched for new techniques and content to give his work more fullness and depth. Repin had a set of favorite subjects, and a limited circle of people whose portraits he painted. But he had a deep sense of purpose in his aesthetics, and had the great artistic gift to sense the spirit of the age and its reflection in the lives and characters of individuals. Repin's search for truth and for an ideal led him in various directions artistically, influenced by hidden aspects of social and spiritual experiences as well as national culture. Like most Russian realists of his times, Repin often based his works on dramatic conflicts, drawn from contemporary life or history. He also used mythological images with a strong sense of purpose; some of his religious paintings are among his greatest.

Drawings and sketches 

With some of his paintings, Repin made one hundred or more preliminary sketches. He began his works with sketches in pencil or charcoal, using lines and cross-hatching. Often he would rub the drawing with his finger or an eraser to get the precise shading that he desired. He sometimes used drawings or paintings of his children to experiment with different points of view. For his large paintings, he made very detailed studies, experimenting with the composition and judging the overall impression.

Genre painting 

No Russian painter of the 19th or 20th century was more skilled at genre painting, portraying scenes of daily life in a sympathetic and perceptive way, giving each character a distinct purpose and personality. His works ranged from domestic scenes to small dramas, such as policemen arresting a young militant for distributing revolutionary tracts.

Repin and Ukraine 

In the 1870s to 1880s he visited Chuguyev and gathered materials for his future works. There, he painted his Archdeacon.

Paintings of Repin inspired by Ukrainian culture include:

The Repin Museum in his birthplace of Chugeev presents objects and works from his early life in Ukraine.

 Man with a bad eye (1876)
 Ukrainian girl by the fence (1876)
 Mohnachi village near Chuguyev (1877)
 Portret of M. Murashko (1877)
 Reply of the Zaporozhian Cossacks (1880–1891, two versions: St. Petersburg, and Kharkiv)
 Vechornytsi (1881)
 Ukrainian village woman (1886)
 Taras Shevchenko's portrait (1888)
 Haydamaka (1902)
 Cossacks on the Black Sea (1908)
 Prometheus (1910, after T. Shevchenko's poem)
 Hopak (1930)

Repin was a member of the committee, set up to create a monument to painter-poet Taras Shevchenko whom he called an "apostle of freedom". He illustrated novels such as Taras Bulba and Sorochinsky Fair by Nikolai Gogol (1872–82) and Zaporissya in the remains of ancient legends and people by Dmytro Yavornytsky (1887), and drew numerous sketches of architecture as well as different popular aspects of Ukrainian culture. Repin's sphere of knowledge included a number of prominent thinkers of the time, including Marko Kropyvnytskyi, Mykola Murashko, and Dmytro Yavornytsky.

Repin helped the committee of the Visual Arts Union in Mykolaiv. He was also an honorary member of Literature and Art Union, as well as Union of the Antiquities and Art in Kiev. He supported numerous painters, Murashko's art schools in Kiev, M. Rajevska-Ivanova in Kharkiv, and the Art school in Odessa.

In one of his last letters he wrote: "kind, dear compatriots [...] I ask you to believe in the sense of my devotion and endless regret that I can't move to live in a sweet, joyful Ukraine [...] Loving you from the childhood, Ilya Repin". The painter was buried by the "Chuguyev's hill", a place at the end of his property in Penates.

Style and technique 

Repin persistently searched for new techniques and content to give his work more fullness and depth. Repin had a set of favorite subjects, and a limited circle of people whose portraits he painted. But he had a deep sense of purpose in his aesthetics, and had the great artistic gift to sense the spirit of the age and its reflection in the lives and characters of individuals. Repin's search for truth and for an ideal led him in various directions artistically, influenced by hidden aspects of social and spiritual experiences as well as national culture. Like most Russian realists of his times, Repin often based his works on dramatic conflicts, drawn from contemporary life or history. He also used mythological images with a strong sense of purpose; some of his religious paintings are among his greatest.

His method was the reverse of the general approach of impressionism. He produced works slowly and carefully. They were the result of close and detailed study. He was never satisfied with his works, and often painted multiple versions, years apart. He also changed and adjusted his methods constantly in order to obtain more effective arrangement, grouping and coloristic power. Repin's style of portraiture was unique, but owed something to the influence of Édouard Manet and Diego Velázquez.

Legacy
Repin was the first Russian artist to achieve European fame using specifically Russian themes. His 1873 painting Barge Haulers on the Volga, radically different from previous Russian paintings, made him the leader of a new movement of critical realism in Russian art. He chose nature and character over academic formalism. The triumph of this work was widespread, and it was praised by contemporaries like Vladimir Stasov and Fyodor Dostoyevsky. The paintings show his feeling of personal responsibility for the hard life of the common people and the destiny of Russia.

Gallery

Notes

References

Bibliography

Further reading

Jackson, David, The Russian Vision: The Art of Ilya Repin (Schoten, Belgium, 2006) 
Karageorgevich, Prince Bojidar, "Professor Repin," in the Magazine of Art, xxiii. p. 783 (1899)
Prymak, Thomas M., "A Painter from Ukraine: Ilya Repin," Canadian Slavonic Papers, LV, 1–2 (2013), 19–43.
 Prymak, Thomas M., "Message to Mehmed: Repin Creates his Zaporozhian Cossacks," in his Ukraine, the Middle East, and the West (Montreal and Kingston: McGill-Queen's University Press, 2021), pp. 173–200.
Шишанов, В.А. «Ниспровержение на пьедестал»: Илья Репин в советской печати 1920–1930-х годов / В.А. Шишанов // Архип Куинджи и его роль в развитии художественного процесса в ХХ веке. Илья Репин в контексте русского и европейского искусства. Василий Дмитриевич Поленов и русская художественная культура второй половины XIX – первых десятилетий XX века : материалы научных конференций. – М. : Гос. Третьяковская галерея, 2020. – С. 189–206.

1844 births
1930 deaths
19th-century painters from the Russian Empire
20th-century painters from the Russian Empire
20th-century Russian painters
Recipients of the Legion of Honour
Members of the Russian Academy
Members of the Serbian Academy of Sciences and Arts
People from Chuhuiv
People from Kharkov Governorate
Peredvizhniki
Male biographers
Russian biographers
Ukrainian biographers
Russian illustrators
Russian male essayists
Russian realist painters
Russian male painters
Russian portrait painters
Russian memoirists
Essayists from the Russian Empire
Imperial Academy of Arts alumni
Full Members of the Imperial Academy of Arts
Portrait artists
Soviet emigrants to Finland
Ukrainian emigrants to Finland
19th-century male artists from the Russian Empire
20th-century Russian male artists
Members of the Royal Swedish Academy of Arts
Foreign members of the Serbian Academy of Sciences and Arts
Russian anti-communists